Lucian Mureșan (born 23 May 1931) is the first and current Major Archbishop of the Greek Catholic Archdiocese of Făgăraș and Alba Iulia and a cardinal of the Catholic Church. As Major Archbishop of Făgăraș and Alba Iulia (resident in Blaj), he is the head of the Romanian Church United with Rome, Greek-Catholic.

Biography

Early life
Lucian Mureșan was born in the village of Firiza (now the Ferneziu district of Baia Mare), Romania, the tenth of Peter and Maria Mureșan's twelve children. He attended primary school in Firiza between 1938 and 1944 and later secondary school in Baia Mare from 1944 to 1948 at the Gheorghe Șincai High School.

The 1948 educational reform banned all religions in schools in the country, especially by Decree no. 358 of 1948 of the Great National Assembly, in which the Romanian Greek Catholic Church was brutally repressed and declared illegal and, therefore, the hope of training and becoming a priest was unattainable and he withdrew from school.

Between 1948 and 1951, Mureșan attended school for woodworking (fine furniture) in Baia Mare, and continued his education part-time to complete his studies. From 1951 to 1954, he did military service, which was mandatory at the time, at the aviation school in Turnișor, Sibiu County. After finishing his military training, he joined the jet aviation battalion in Craiova. In 1953, because of his connection with the Romanian Greek Catholic Church, he was considered an undesirable person and was transferred from the aviation battalion to work on the construction of the country's first large hydroelectric plant, at the Bicaz Dam.

In 1954, he left Bicaz and waiting for an opportunity to study theology in secret, he worked in different places. At the suggestion of Bishop Iuliu Hossu and the blessing of Bishop Alexandru Rusu, on the proposal of Prof. Dr. Silviu Augustin Prunduș (released from prison in 1955), Bishop Aron Marton of Alba Iulia agreed to receive, as an exception, five young people, one for each diocese of the Romanian Greek Catholic Church, at the  Roman Catholic Theological Institute of Alba Iulia for the academic degree, among them was Lucian. In the fourth year of studies, the rector of the institute told him and another student that he kept to the original five, that they were expelled by the Department of Cults and that within 24 hours they would be forced to leave not only the institute, but also from the city. In terms of ecclesiastical and canonical laws, there was no reason for expulsion. He returned to his original place. The expulsion coincided with the start of the persecution and repression by Securitate. For a year he focused on working in mining and construction companies, but was rejected on the grounds that he was a Catholic theologian. After a year, he managed to find a job as a worker at the quarry in Ferneziu, where he worked for almost 10 years. When he was persecuted there, he transferred to the Department of Roads and Bridges in Maramureș, where he worked until his retirement in June 1990. Despite intimidation, harassment and threats, he did not give up on his dream of becoming a priest, continuing their studies in hiding, with former professors from the theological academy who were fugitives. All students took their licensing exam. In 1964, a decree-pardon was issued and the bishops were released from prison. In this way, he could finally become a priest.

Priest
Mureșan was ordained on 19 December 1964, by Ioan Dragomir, titular bishop of Palaeopoli in Pamfilia, auxiliary bishop of Maramureș. Initially, he exercised his pastoral ministry in hiding, while working in the quarry and then in the Department of Roads and Bridges. His pastoral ministry was mainly dedicated to young people and those who wanted to become priests. He later worked as a priest more openly in the diocese of Maramureș.

The clergy of his rite asked him to reorganize his pastoral ministry. After Bishop Dragomir's death on 25 April 1985, he held the provisional function of Ordinarius of the diocese of Maramureș until 9 August 1986, and since that date, the selection and proposal of the diocesan chapter, Mureșan was installed on the property by Metropolitan Archbishop of Făgăraș and Alba Iulia Alexandru Todea. In December 1989, the Romanian Revolution occurred, the communist government was overthrown by force and the head of state, Nicolae Ceaușescu, was executed. Shortly thereafter, the Romanian Greek Catholic Church was legalized.

Bishop
Elected Eparch of Maramureș of the Romanians on 14 March 1990, Mureșan was consecrated on 27 May, on the terrace of the Romanian Soldier's Monument, in Baia Mare, by Alexandru Todea, archbishop of Făgăraș and Alba Iulia of the Romanians, assisted by Ioan Ploscaru, Bishop of Lugoj of the Romanians, and by Guido del Mestri, Titular Archbishop of Tuscamia, former apostolic nuncio to Germany, in the presence of 100 priests and more than 20,000 faithful. The terrace was symbolically adorned with a huge rosary of red carnations. It was the first meeting of the entire Greek Catholic hierarchy gathered at a large public event and in the presence of a papal representative. At the ceremony, a decree-law by the President of the Republic recognizing him as a bishop was read.

Mureșan opened the Baia Mare Theological Institute in the academic year 1990-1991 and was promoted to the Metropolitan See of Făgăraș and Alba Iulia of the Romanians on 4 July 1994, and on 27 August he was installed in Blaj. Mureșan began the reconstruction of the Metropolitan Cathedral of the Holy Trinity in Bournemouth, which was completed in 1994. He convened and participated in the four sessions of the Fourth Provincial Council of the Romanian Greek Catholic Church, held between 1995 and 1998. He participated in 1995 in the celebrations of the 50th anniversary of the Romanian Catholic Mission in Paris, for which he celebrated Mass in Romanian at Notre-Dame Cathedral in Paris. In August 1997, due to his effort, the remains of Dom Inocențiu Micu-Klein were taken to the cathedral of Blaj (founded by him), from Rome, where he had died in exile 252 years earlier. In 1997, he obtained the nihil obstat from the Congregation for the Causes of Saints to open the process of canonization of the seven Greek Catholic bishops who were martyred during the communist regime.

Between 1998 and 2001 and again in 2004, Mureșan was elected president of the Romanian Catholic Bishops' Conference, which includes the hierarchy of the Catholic Church of both rites, Latin (Roman Catholic) and Eastern (Greek-Catholic). Between 7 and 9 May 1999, he received Pope John Paul II during his visit to Romania.

During the Jubilee of the Year 2000, he organized a national pilgrimage to Rome, culminating in a concelebrated mass in Romanian with Pope John Paul II, in St. Peter's Basilica, with the participation of thousands of Romanian pilgrims. On 26 May 2003, Mureșan was appointed a member of the Congregation for the Oriental Churches and was promoted to the post of Major Archbishop on 16 December 2005, when Pope Benedict XVI recognized the self-government status of the Romanian Greek Catholic Church, raising his traditional head, the Archdiocese of Făgăraș and Alba Iulia, to the post of major archdiocese.

Cardinal
Pope Benedict XVI created him a Cardinal-Priest in the First Ordinary Public consistory on 18 February, receiving the title of cardinal-priest of Sant'Atanasio. As he was already older than 80 at the time of his creation, he has no right to vote in a papal conclave.

On 6 June 2015, Mureșan received the national commendation Order of the Star of Romania, Officer rank from President Klaus Iohannis of Romania.

References

External links

 
The Cardinals of the Holy Roman Church
 Catholic Hierarchy
 GCatholic
 Data and coat of arms in Araldica Vaticana

1930 births
Living people
People from Baia Mare
Primates of the Romanian Greek Catholic Church
Romanian cardinals
Cardinals created by Pope Benedict XVI
Honorary members of the Romanian Academy
20th-century Eastern Catholic archbishops
21st-century Eastern Catholic archbishops
Eastern Catholic bishops in Romania
Officers of the Order of the Star of Romania